The Kwakiutl First Nation is a First Nations government based on northern Vancouver Island in British Columbia, Canada, focused on the community of Port Hardy, British Columbia in the Queen Charlotte Strait region, and also known as the Fort Rupert Band, known in traditional Kwakwaka'wakw terms as the Kwagu'ł or Kwagyewlth. It is a member of the Kwakiutl District Council.  It is currently in stage 4 of the British Columbia Treaty Process, having submitted a statement of intent in 1997.

The chief of the Kwakiutl is Councillor Grace Wilson. There are approximately 835 members of the Kwakiutl nation.

History 
In 1851, the ancestors of the Kwakiutl entered into treaties with James Douglas, then acting as agent for the Hudson's Bay Company, so that the company could gain access to coal deposits on the northeast coast of Vancouver Island. However the nation asserts that the treaty was violated and has been in litigation with the province of British Columbia for a number of years.

References

See also
Port Hardy, British Columbia
Fort Rupert, British Columbia
Kwakwaka'wakw
Kwak'wala (language)

Kwakwaka'wakw governments
Central Coast of British Columbia

de:Kwakiutl (Volk)